Helck is a Japanese manga series written and illustrated by Nanaki Nanao. It was serialized in Shogakukan's Ura Sunday website and MangaONE app from May 2014 to December 2017, with its chapters collected into twelve tankōbon volumes. An anime television series adaptation by Satelight is set to premiere in July 2023.

Plot
It has been three months since the Demon Lord was defeated by a lone human hero. While the humans celebrated their victory, the Demon realm quickly organized a tournament to choose their next Lord. One peculiar contestant quickly rising up through the tournament is a human hero named Helck, who claims to hate his own kind. Vermilio the Red, one of the Elite Four Demons overseeing the tournament, immediately suspects Helck of being a saboteur and tries to rig the following matches into games of skill, but Helck continues to win. Vermilio soon finds out that Helck is a wanted criminal in the human world, suspected of killing his brother, who happens to be the legendary hero Cress, the one who killed the Demon Lord. Vermilio still wants to know, what is Helck's true motivation for entering the tournament? What happened in the human world over the past three months? And what are these mysterious winged soldiers now threatening the Demon realm in place of the humans?

Characters

Media

Manga
Written and illustrated by Nanaki Nanao, Helck was serialized in Shogakukan's Ura Sunday website and MangaONE app from May 5, 2014, to December 18, 2017. Shogakukan collected its chapters into twelve tankōbon volumes, published from August 2014 to May 2018. In April 2022, Shogakukan began publishing new edition volumes that feature color pages from the original series run and new covers.

In June 2022, Viz Media announced that they licensed the series for English publication.

A spin-off manga titled Piwi: Fushigi na Ikimono was serialized in the MangaONE app from July 16 to October 8, 2018. It has been collected into a single tankōbon volume, published on November 12 of the same year.

A prequel manga titled Völundio: Divergent Sword Saga began serialization in the Ura Sunday website and the MangaONE app on August 31, 2020. It has been collected into four tankōbon volumes as of February 2023. The series is licensed digitally in English by Comikey.

Volume list

New edition

Piwi: Fushigi na Ikimono

Völundio: Divergent Sword Saga

Anime
An anime adaptation was announced by Nanaki Nanao on February 14, 2022, later revealed to be a television series. It is produced by Satelight and directed by Tatsuo Sato, with scripts written by Toshizo Nemoto and Mitsutaka Hirota, character designs handled by Yoshinori Deno, and music composed by Yoshihisa Hirano. The series is set to premiere in July 2023 on NTV and BS NTV. Sentai Filmworks licensed the series, and will be streaming it on Hidive.

Reception
In 2015, Helck placed eighth in the first Next Manga Award. In 2017, the series placed fifth in the male category of the Hyakuman Hito ga Erabu Hontō ni Omoshiroi WEB Comic wa Kore da! polls. The series' prequel, Völundio: Divergent Sword Saga, was nominated for the Next Manga Award in the web manga category in 2022 and placed 18th out of 50 nominees.

References

External links
  
  
  
 

Adventure anime and manga
Anime series based on manga
Fantasy anime and manga
Japanese webcomics
Nippon TV original programming
Satelight
Sentai Filmworks
Shōnen manga
Shogakukan manga
Upcoming anime television series
Viz Media manga
Webcomics in print